Northallerton was a parliamentary borough in the North Riding of Yorkshire, represented by two Members of Parliament in the House of Commons briefly in the 13th century and again from 1640 to 1832, and by one member from 1832 until 1885.

The constituency consisted of the market town of Northallerton, the county town of the North Riding. In 1831 it encompassed only 622 houses and a population of 3,004. The right to vote was vested in the holders of the burgage tenements, of which there were roughly 200 – most of which were ruined or consisted only of stables or cowhouses, and had no value except for the vote which was attached to them. As in most other burgage boroughs, the ownership of the burgages had early become concentrated in the hands of a single family, who in effect had a free hand to nominate both MPs. At the time of the Great Reform Act in 1832, the patrons were the Earl of Harewood and Henry Peirse, who was the Earl's brother-in-law.

Under the Reform Act, the boundaries were extended to include neighbouring Romanby and Brompton, increasing the population to 4,839, and its representation was reduced to a single member. The Act also, of course, extended the franchise.

At the 1885 election, the constituency was abolished, being absorbed into the new Richmond division of the North Riding.

Members of Parliament

Northallerton re-enfranchised by Parliament, Nov 1640

MPs 1640–1832

MPs 1832–1885

Election results

Elections in the 1830s

Elections in the 1840s

Elections in the 1850s

Elections in the 1860s

The election was declared void on petition, due to bribery by agents, causing a by-election.

Elections in the 1870s

Elections in the 1880s

Notes and references

D Brunton & D H Pennington, "Members of the Long Parliament" (London: George Allen & Unwin, 1954)
"Cobbett's Parliamentary history of England, from the Norman Conquest in 1066 to the year 1803" (London: Thomas Hansard, 1808) 
J Holladay Philbin, "Parliamentary Representation 1832 – England and Wales" (New Haven: Yale University Press, 1965)
Henry Stooks Smith, "The Parliaments of England from 1715 to 1847" (2nd edition, edited by FWS Craig – Chichester: Parliamentary Reference Publications, 1973)
 Frederic A Youngs, jr, "Guide to the Local Administrative Units of England, Vol II" (London: Royal Historical Society, 1991)

History of North Yorkshire
Parliamentary constituencies in Yorkshire and the Humber (historic)
Constituencies of the Parliament of the United Kingdom established in 1640
Constituencies of the Parliament of the United Kingdom disestablished in 1885
Northallerton